Saugerties High School is a public high school in Saugerties, New York, United States. It is physically attached to the Junior High School which runs from 7th to 8th grade. It is the only High School in the Saugerties Central School District.

Notable alumni
 Jimmy Fallon (1992) – comedian, host of The Tonight Show Starring Jimmy Fallon

References

Public high schools in New York (state)
Schools in Ulster County, New York